Us is a commune in the Val-d'Oise department and Île-de-France region of France.

Geography
The village lies in a rural setting in the valley of the River Viosne, some 40 km north-west of Paris, within the Vexin Regional Nature Park. The commune is bordered by those of Ableiges, Marines, Santeuil, and Vigny. The nearest shopping centre is at Marines.

Sights
The church of Notre-Dame, parts of which date from the 13th century. 
The 19th-century Château de Dampont and its park.

Transport
Us has a railway station on the line from Gisors to Pontoise and Paris (Gare Saint-Lazare).

Education
The town has a preschool. In 2016 it asked for donations to the school on Facebook.

See also
Communes of the Val-d'Oise department

References

External links
Official site 

Association of Mayors of the Val d'Oise 

Communes of Val-d'Oise